Paul Schuyt (born 1957) is a Dutch businessman and IT entrepreneur who is best known for business accomplishments and long-term career in Logica, the second largest IT provider in Europe where he spent over 23 years. In 2009, he became Chief Executive Officer at Levi9 Global Sourcing, European nearshore IT service group.

Companies

Levi9 Global Sourcing
Paul Schuyt joined Levi9 Global Sourcing as a Chief Executive Officer on 1 August 2009. With the experience in managing the growth of Logica from €450 million in 2003 to €750 million revenue by the end of 2008, Paul Schuyt was considered by the Dutch press as a right man for this job.

Logica
Prior to join Levi9 Global Sourcing Schuyt spent 23 years at Logica (former CMG), an international ICT company with more than 40,000 employees.  He started his career in 1987 as a management consultant and held various management positions until 2003 when he became a Chief Executive and member of Logica Executive Committee.

TNT Post
Before Logica Paul Schuyt held various management positions including Director Organization at TNT Post, a Dutch international transport and logistics corporation.

Publicity

Paul Schuyt takes active roles in various public and business-education organizations by being a board member of Dutch ICT office, an organization that unites over 500 companies in the Dutch IT, Telecom, Office and Internet sectors, board member of UNC, Lecturer at Nijenrode (business school), Lecturer at Technical University of Delft.

As a CEO of Levi9 Global Sourcing Paul Schuyt together with associates Bernhard Van Oranje and Menno de Jong have officially opened a regular session of NYSE Euronext Amsterdam with "bell ceremony".

References

1957 births
Living people
Dutch chief executives in the technology industry
Dutch businesspeople
Dutch corporate directors
Businesspeople in information technology
Businesspeople in computing
Businesspeople in software
People from Heemskerk
Leiden University alumni